Thomas-McJunkin-Love House is a historic home located at Charleston, West Virginia.  It was built for James R. Thomas, president of the Carbon Fuel Company, a coal mining business in the Kanawha Valley.  Known originally as "The Maples," it was built for him and his family around 1921.  It is in the English Tudor style and features half timbering in some of the gables and brick in others, but the exterior is predominantly in stucco.

It was listed on the National Register of Historic Places in 1984 as part of the South Hills Multiple Resource Area.

References

Houses in Charleston, West Virginia
Houses completed in 1921
Houses on the National Register of Historic Places in West Virginia
National Register of Historic Places in Charleston, West Virginia
Tudor Revival architecture in West Virginia